PAS/CAL was an indie pop band from Detroit, Michigan founded in 2002 by frontman Casimer Pascal, aka Craig Benedict Valentine Badynee. The group went on to release three EPs and two 12" inch split singles over the next four years. In December 2004, American webzine Somewhere Cold ranked their EP Oh Honey, We're Ridiculous EP of the Year on their 2004 Somewhere Cold Awards Hall of Fame list.

After an exhaustive two years spent writing & recording their debut LP, I Was Raised On Matthew, Mark, Luke & Laura, which was released on July 22, 2008 via Le Grand Magistery, PAS/CAL disbanded.

Discography
I Was Raised On Matthew, Mark, Luke & Laura (Le Grand Magistery, 2008)
Dear Sir EP (Le Grand Magistery, 2006)
Summer Is Almost Here 12" (Romantic Air Recording Co, 2005)
Season's Greetings from PAS/CAL & Asobi Seksu 12" (Romantic Air Recording Co, 2004)
Oh Honey, We're Ridiculous EP (Le Grand Magistery, 2004)
The Handbag Memoirs EP (Le Grand Magistery, 2002)

References

External links
Virtually every official PAS/CAL recording via Bandcamp
Interview with Casimer on ARTISTdirect
Interview with Casimer by The Daily Rind
Feature & interview with Casimer in Metrotimes
Stereogum post regarding You Were Too Old For Me

Indie rock musical groups from Michigan
Musical groups from Detroit